In the mathematical field of knot theory, a 2-bridge knot is a knot which can be regular isotoped so that the natural height function given by the z-coordinate has only two maxima and two minima as critical points. Equivalently, these are the knots with bridge number 2, the smallest possible bridge number for a nontrivial knot.

Schubert normal form
The names rational knot and rational link were coined by John Conway who defined them as arising from numerator closures of rational tangles.
This definition can be used to give a bijection between the set of 2-bridge links and the set of rational numbers; the rational number associated to a given link is called
the Schubert normal form of the link (as this invariant was first defined by Schubert), and is precisely the fraction associated to the rational tangle whose numerator closure gives the link.

Further reading
 Louis H. Kauffman, Sofia Lambropoulou: On the classification of rational knots, L' Enseignement Mathématique, 49:357–410 (2003). preprint available at arxiv.org
 C. C. Adams, The Knot Book: An elementary introduction to the mathematical theory of knots. American Mathematical Society, Providence, RI, 2004. xiv+307 pp.

References

External links
 Table and invariants of rational knots with up to 16 crossings

Knot theory